Atuabo Gas Plant is the Natural Gas Processing Plant of the Ghana Gas Company located at Atuabo in the Nzemaland of the Western Region in Ghana.

History

References

Natural gas plants
Energy infrastructure in Ghana
Western Region (Ghana)